Robert MacGregor (1825 – 1883) was a Scottish-born Australian headmaster and politician.

MacGregor was born in Banffshire, Scotland, and was educated in Edinburgh. In 1852 he emigrated to Melbourne and lived in Emerald Hill. He became the headmaster of the South Melbourne Wesleyan day school. In 1863 he founded, as proprietor and headmaster, South Melbourne Grammar School. He was elected to the Legislative Assembly for Fitzroy in 1877–1879 and Emerald Hill 1880 –1883.

References

1825 births
1883 deaths
Scottish emigrants to colonial Australia
Politicians from Melbourne
Australian headmasters
19th-century Australian politicians
Members of the Victorian Legislative Assembly